John Hosea Kerr (December 31, 1873 – June 21, 1958) was an American jurist and politician.

Background
Kerr was born in Yanceyville, Caswell County, North Carolina but lived most of his life in Warrenton, North Carolina. Kerr received his bachelor's degree from Wake Forest University and his law degree from Wake Forest University School of Law. In 1895, Kerr started his law practice in Warrenton, North Carolina. He served as town attorney and then as mayor of Warrenton in 1897 and 1898. In 1905, Kerr served as solicitor and then from 1916 to 1923, Kerr served as superior court judge. Kerr was originally elected to the United States House of Representatives in a special election to fill the vacancy caused by the death of Claude Kitchin in 1923. He lost a bid for re-election in the 1952 Democratic Party primary to Lawrence H. Fountain. Constructed between 1947 and 1953, Kerr Lake, Kerr Lake State Recreation Area, and John H. Kerr Dam is named after him deriving from his instrumental efforts towards the project. Kerr's son, John H. Kerr, Jr., and grandson, John H. Kerr, III, both served in the North Carolina General Assembly. His great uncle John Kerr also served in the United States House of Representatives.

References

External links
 Congressional Biography
 North Carolina Historical Marker
News & Observer: John Kerr dynasty has ended
Settle-Kerr family of North Carolina

1873 births
1958 deaths
North Carolina state court judges
Mayors of places in North Carolina
Democratic Party members of the United States House of Representatives from North Carolina
People from Yanceyville, North Carolina
People from Warrenton, North Carolina
Wake Forest University alumni
Wake Forest University School of Law alumni